Boranes is the name given to compounds with the formula BxHy and related anions.  Many such boranes are known.  Most common are those with 1 to 12 boron atoms.  Although they have few practical applications, the boranes exhibit structures and bonding that differs strongly from the patterns seen in hydrocarbons.  Hybrids of boranes and hydrocarbons, the carboranes are also well developed.

History
The development of the chemistry of boranes led to innovations in synthetic methods as well as structure and bonding. First, new synthetic techniques were required to handle diborane and many of its derivatives, which are both pyrophoric and volatile. Alfred Stock invented the glass vacuum line for this purpose.

The structure of diborane was correctly predicted in 1943 many years after its discovery. The structures of the boron hydride clusters were determined beginning in 1948 with the characterization of decaborane. William Lipscomb was awarded the Nobel prize in Chemistry in 1976 for this and many subsequent crystallographic investigations. These investigations revealed the prevalence of deltahedral structures, i.e., networks of triangular arrays of BH centers.

The bonding of the clusters ushered in Polyhedral skeletal electron pair theory and Wade's rules, which can be used to predict the structures of boranes. These rules were found to describe structures of many cluster compounds.

Interest in boranes increased during World War II due to the potential of uranium borohydride for enrichment of the uranium isotopes and as a source of hydrogen for inflating weather balloons. In the US, a team led by Schlesinger developed the basic chemistry of the anionic boron hydrides and the related aluminium hydrides. Schlesinger's work laid the foundation for a host of boron hydride reagents for organic synthesis, most of which were developed by his student Herbert C. Brown. Borane-based reagents are now widely used in organic synthesis. Brown was awarded the Nobel prize in Chemistry in 1979 for this work.

Chemical formula and naming conventions
Borane clusters are classified as follows, where n is the number of boron atoms in a single cluster:

The International Union of Pure and Applied Chemistry rules for systematic naming is based on a prefix denoting a class of compound, followed by the number of boron atoms and finally the number of hydrogen atoms in parentheses. Various details can be omitted if there is no ambiguity about the meaning, for example, if only one structural type is possible. Some examples of the structures are shown below.

The naming of anions is illustrated by 
octahydridopentaborate, B5H8− 
The hydrogen count is specified first followed by the boron count. The -ate suffix is applied with anions. The ionic charge value is included in the chemical formula but not as part of the systematic name.

Bonding in boranes
Boranes are nonclassically–bonded compounds, that is, there are not enough electrons to form 2-centre, 2-electron bonds between all pairs of adjacent atoms in the molecule. A description of the bonding in the larger boranes was formulated by William Lipscomb. It involved:
 3-center 2-electron B-H-B hydrogen bridges
3-center 2-electron B-B-B bonds
2-center 2-electron bonds (in B-B, B-H and BH2)
Lipscomb's methodology has largely been superseded by a molecular orbital approach. This allows the concept of multi-centre bonding to be extended. For example, in the icosahedral ion [B12H12]2-, the totally symmetric (Ag symmetry) molecular orbital is equally distributed among all 12 boron atoms. Wade's rules provide a powerful method that can be used to rationalize the structures in terms of the number of atoms and the connectivity between them.

Multicluster boranes

Although relatively rare, several multi-cluster boranes have been characterized.  For example, reaction of a borane cluster with B2H6 (as a source of BH3) can lead to the formation of a conjuncto-borane species in which borane cluster sub-units are joined by the sharing of boron atoms.
B6H10 + (BH3) → B7H11 + H2
B7H11 + B6H10 → B13H19 + H2
Other conjuncto-boranes, where the sub-units are joined by a B-B bond, can be made by ultra violet irradiation of nido-boranes. Some B-B coupled conjuncto-boranes can be produced using PtBr2 as catalyst.

Analogous to Wade's Rules, electron counting scheme has been developed to predict or rationalize multicluster boranes.

Reactivity of boranes

The lowest borane, BH3 exists only transiently, dimerizing instantly to form diborane, B2H6.  Its adducts BH3·THF and BH3·DMSO are sufficiently stable to be used in hydroboration reactions. 
Reminiscent of the behavior of diborane, some lower boranes react with air very exothermically, even explosively. By contrast, many closo-borane cluster, such as B12H122−, do not react with air.

The boron hydride clusters are so diverse that generalizations on their reactions are not possible.

Lewis acid/base behavior
some function as electron donors owing to the relative basic character of the B-Hterminal groups. Boranes can function as ligands in coordination compounds. Hapticities of η1 to η6 have been found, with electron donation involving bridging H atoms or donation from B-B bonds. For example, nido-B6H10 can replace ethene in Zeise's salt to produce Fe(η2-B6H10)(CO)4.

They can also act as Lewis acids, with concomitant opening of the cluster. An example involving trimethylphosphine:
B5H9 + 2 PMe3 → B5H9(PMe3)2

Brønsted acid/base behavior
Some higher boranes, especially those with bridging hydrogen atoms, can be deprotonated with a strong base. An example:
B5H9 + NaH → Na(B5H8) + H2
Acidity increases with the size of the borane. B10H14 has a pK value of 2.7.
 B5H9 < B6H10 < B10H14 < B16H20 < B18H22

Aufbau reactions
For the boron hydride chemist, one of the most important reactions is the building up process by which smaller boron hydride clusters add borane to give larger clusters.  This approach also applies to the synthesis of metallaboranes,

Hydroboration
Reminiscent of the behavior of diborane and its adducts, higher boranes participate in hydroboration.  When boron hydrides add an alkyne, the carbon becomes incorporated into the cluster, producing carboranes, e.g. C2B10H12.

Applications
Diborane and its monomeric adducts borane–tetrahydrofuran or borane–dimethylsulfide are useful reagents. They are often used for hydroboration in organic synthesis.  Some higher boranes, including anti-B18H22, have demonstrated luminescent properties.  Some cobalt derivative of carboranes have been commercialized for sequestering 137Cs from radioactive waste.

Aspirational uses
Because boron hydride clusters readily absorb neutrons, their derivatives have often been investigated for applications in Neutron capture therapy of cancer. One favored compound is the Na2[B12H11(SH)]. It makes use of the fact that 10B has a very high neutron-capture cross section, so neutron irradiation is highly selective for the region where the compound resides. 
10B + 1n → (11B*) → 4He + 7Li + γ (2.4 Mev)

Boranes have a high specific energy of combustion compared to hydrocarbons, making them potentially attractive as fuels. Intense research was carried out in the 1950s into their use as jet fuel additives, but the effort did not lead to practical results.

See also 
 :Category:Boranes, containing all specific borane-compound articles
 Sara Rietti, nuclear chemist from Argentina

References